Hope, previously known as Ranzau, is a small settlement south of Nelson, New Zealand, between Richmond and Wakefield.

Hope began as a German settlement, founded by many of the families on the barque Skjold, which left Hamburg on 21 April 1844 and arrived in Nelson on 1 September. The voyage was underwritten by German nobleman ; in appreciation, early farmer Carl Kelling gave his homestead the name Ranzau, a name used for the entire village until it was renamed after Jane Hope, another early settler. The German influence survives in Ranzau Road, which itself houses Ranzau School (dating from 1848) as well as a Lutheran church (established in 1849) opposite the newer Hope Community Church.

Today the settlement remains largely rural, dominated by farms and orchards. There are two primary schools (Ranzau School and Hope School), scattered speciality shops (many operating from an orchard or market garden), a restaurant/bar, a convenience store, and a park with tennis courts and a recreation hall.

Demographics

Hope had a population of 930 at the 2018 New Zealand census, an increase of 42 people (4.7%) since the 2013 census, and an increase of 18 people (2.0%) since the 2006 census. There were 327 households. There were 477 males and 453 females, giving a sex ratio of 1.05 males per female. The median age was 44.4 years (compared with 37.4 years nationally), with 150 people (16.1%) aged under 15 years, 171 (18.4%) aged 15 to 29, 471 (50.6%) aged 30 to 64, and 138 (14.8%) aged 65 or older.

Ethnicities were 93.9% European/Pākehā, 10.0% Māori, 3.2% Pacific peoples, 1.3% Asian, and 2.9% other ethnicities (totals add to more than 100% since people could identify with multiple ethnicities).

The proportion of people born overseas was 11.9%, compared with 27.1% nationally.

Although some people objected to giving their religion, 57.1% had no religion, 34.5% were Christian, 0.3% were Buddhist and 1.6% had other religions.

Of those at least 15 years old, 105 (13.5%) people had a bachelor or higher degree, and 156 (20.0%) people had no formal qualifications. The median income was $33,900, compared with $31,800 nationally. The employment status of those at least 15 was that 453 (58.1%) people were employed full-time, 138 (17.7%) were part-time, and 12 (1.5%) were unemployed.

Education

References

Populated places in the Tasman District